Enteromius atakorensis is a species of cyprinid fish. It is endemic to West Africa, being found in Nigeria west to Ghana and Burkina Faso. It is a benthopelagic freshwater species that grows to  standard length.

References

Enteromius
Freshwater fish of Africa
Fish described in 1957
Taxa named by Jacques Daget